
AD 25 (XXV) was a common year starting on Monday (link will display the full calendar) of the Julian calendar. At the time, it was known as the Year of the Consulship of Lentulus and Agrippa (or, less frequently, year 778 Ab urbe condita). The denomination AD 25 for this year has been used since the early medieval period, when the Anno Domini calendar era became the prevalent method in Europe for naming years.

Events

By place

Roman Empire 
 Emperor Tiberius settles a dispute between Messenia and Sparta over the Ager Dentheliales on Mount Taygetus, awarding the land to Messenia.
 Lucius Aelius Sejanus unsuccessfully attempts to marry Livilla.

China 
 August 5 – The Han Dynasty is restored in China as Liu Xiu proclaims himself Emperor Guangwu of Han, starting the Jianwu era (until AD 56).
 November 27 – Luoyang becomes the capital of the Houhan or Eastern Han Dynasty.

Births 
 Gaius Julius Civilis, Batavian military leader
 Quintus Volusius Saturninus, Roman consul

Deaths 
 Aulus Cremutius Cordus, Roman historian and writer
 Gengshi, Chinese emperor of the Han Dynasty
 Gnaeus Cornelius Lentulus, Roman consul (b. 54 BC)
 Lucius Antonius, grandson of Mark Antony (b. 20 BC)
 Lucius Domitius Ahenobarbus, Roman consul (b. 49 BC)
 Ruzi Ying, Chinese emperor of the Western Han (b. AD 5)

References 

0025

als:20er#25